How Long: Ultra Naté Best Remixes, Vol. 2 is a compilation consisting of remixes of the singles from Ultra Naté's second album, One Woman's Insanity. This compilation was released on March 30, 1999.

Track listings
 1. "How Long" (Wingston Hip-Hop Edit)
 2. "Show Me" (Original Extended Version)
 3. "Joy" (What Rave? Mix)
 4. "Incredibly You"
 5. "Show Me" (Masters at Work 12" Dub)
 6. "How Long" (Fire Island Remix)
 7. "How Long" (Ultra's House Swing)
 8. "Show Me" (Chameleon House Mix)
 9. "Joy" (Never Ending Joy Mix)
 10. "How Long" (118th Street Instrumental)

External links
[ All Music: Situation: Critical]

Ultra Naté albums
1999 remix albums
Warner Records remix albums